Rathgama is a small coastal town situated in Galle District, Southern Province of Sri Lanka.

Etymology 
The village is also known 'Rajgama', which means kings village. The village was gifted by Parākramabāhu II to Minister Devapathiraja for his loyalty in the 12th century during the Dambadenyia period.

Education 
 Devapathiraja College
 Sir Ernest de Silva Vidyalaya
 Sirisumana Vidyalaya

See also
List of towns in Southern Province, Sri Lanka

Populated places in Southern Province, Sri Lanka